Baba Langar (also Romanized as Bābā Langar; also known as Bābā Langow and Langar) is a village in Yam Rural District, Meshkan District, Khoshab County, Razavi Khorasan Province, Iran. At the 2006 census, its population was 109, in 28 families.

See also 

 List of cities, towns and villages in Razavi Khorasan Province

References 

Populated places in Khoshab County